This is a list of art galleries, paint studios, cultural centers and other institutions operating in Albania.

Art galleries
 National Art Gallery of Albania
 National Museum of Photography (Marubi)

Cultural centers
 Cultural Center "Tirana"

Paint studios
 Amos paint studio
 Kërpaçi paint studio
 Tica paint studio
 Xhevdet Dada paint studio
 Zaya paint studio

See also
 List of museums in Albania

References

Art galleries